Green River may refer to:

Rivers

Canada
Green River (British Columbia), a tributary of the Lillooet River
Green River, a tributary of the Saint John River, also known by its French name of Rivière Verte
Green River (Ontario), a tributary of the Crowe River

United States
 Green River (Illinois), a tributary of the Rock River
 Green River (Kentucky), a tributary of the Ohio River
 Green River (Housatonic River tributary), a tributary of the Housatonic River in Massachusetts and New York
 Green River (Hoosic River tributary), a tributary of the Hoosic River in Massachusetts
 Green River (Deerfield River tributary), a tributary of the Deerfield River in Massachusetts and Vermont
 Green River (Cold River tributary), a river of Massachusetts
 Green River (Jordan River tributary), a tributary of the Jordan River in Antrim County, Michigan
 Green River (Intermediate River tributary), part of the Elk River Chain of Lakes Watershed in Antrim County, Michigan
 Green River (North Carolina)
 Green River (North Dakota), a tributary of the Heart River
 Green River (Oregon), a tributary of Five Rivers
 Green River (Missouri), a river of Missouri
 Green River (Tennessee), a tributary of the Buffalo River
 Green River (Texas), a tributary of the Rio Grande
 Green River (Batten Kill), a river of Vermont
 Green River (Lamoille River tributary), a river of Vermont
 Green River (Colorado River tributary), major tributary of the Colorado River, headwaters in Wyoming, flowing into Utah with a loop into Colorado
 Green River (Duwamish River tributary), a tributary of the Duwamish River in the U.S. state of Washington
 Green River (North Fork Toutle River tributary), the largest tributary of the North Fork Toutle River in the U.S. state of Washington
 Green River (Toutle River tributary), a river of Washington

Elsewhere
Green River (Northern Cape), a river in the Northern Cape Province, South Africa
 Yeşilırmak (river), a river of northern Turkey

Communities
Green River, Illinois, an unincorporated community in Henry County
Green River, Utah, a city in Emery County
Green River, Wyoming, a city in Sweetwater County
Green River, a ghost town in British Columbia
Green River, a community in Pickering, Ontario
Rivière-Verte, New Brunswick, a village in Madawaska County
Green River Rural LLG, local-level government in Sandaun Province, Papua New Guinea

Music
Green River (band), a grunge band from Seattle, Washington
Green River (album), a 1969 album by Creedence Clearwater Revival
"Green River" (song), a 1969 song from that album
"Green River", a song by C. W. McCall on the album Black Bear Road
"Green River", a song by Waylon Jennings from the album Nashville Rebel
"Green River", a song by The Everly Brothers from the album Stories We Could Tell
"Green River", a song from the Dixie Chick's debut album Thank Heavens for Dale Evans
"Green River", a song by Hooded Fang from the 2010 album titled Album
"Green River", a song by Real Estate from the album Real Estate
"Green River", an instrumental by Church of Misery from the album Master of Brutality

Transportation
 Green River station (Utah), an Amtrak train station in Green River, Utah, United States
 Green River station, a former Amtrak train station in Green River, Wyoming, United States

Other uses
Green River (soft drink), a bright green, lime-flavored soft drink which originated in Chicago. It was created by the Schoenhofen Edelweiss Brewing Company in 1919, and is currently manufactured by WIT Beverage Company
 Novell "Green River", codename for Novell NetWare 4.11
Green River Community College, community college in Auburn, Washington
Green River Formation, a geologic formation in the States of Colorado, Wyoming, and Utah in the United States of America
Green River Killer or Gary Ridgway, an American serial killer
Green River Launch Complex, a missile testing ground outside Green River, Utah, operated by the U. S. Air Force from 1964 to 1973
Green River Ordinance,  a common United States city ordinance prohibiting door-to-door solicitation

See also
Green Creek (disambiguation)